Bevilacqua is an Italian surname, meaning "drink the water". Notable people with the surname include:

Alberto Bevilacqua (1934–2013), Italian writer and film director
Anthony Bevilacqua (1923–2012), American Roman Catholic cardinal
Antonella Bevilacqua (born 1971), Italian high jumper
Antonio Bevilacqua (1918–1972), Italian cyclist
Berna Bevilacqua (1950–1996), Argentine pianist
Bonifazio Bevilacqua Aldobrandini (1571–1627), Italian cardinal
Charles A. Bevilacqua (1930-2019), United States Navy Seabee
Christophe (singer) (born 1945), stage name of French singer, Daniel Bevilacqua
Claire Bevilacqua (born 1983), Australian surfer
Giacomo Bevilacqua (born 1983), Italian cartoonist and author of comics
Giovanni Ambrogio Bevilacqua (active by 1481 to at least 1512), Italian painter 
Giulio Bevilacqua (1881–1965), Italian Roman Catholic cardinal
Joe Bevilacqua (born 1959), American actor and writer
Joseph A. Bevilacqua Sr. (1918-1989), American jurist associated with organized crime
Luiz Bevilacqua, Brazilian scientist
Maurizio Bevilacqua (born 1960), Canadian politician
Peter Bevilacqua (born 1933), Australian rules footballer and soccer player
Tony Bevilacqua (born 1976), American musician
Ventura Salimbeni (1568–1613), later called Bevilacqua, Italian painter and printmaker

Fictional
Matthew Bevilacqua, DiMeo crime family associate

Italian-language surnames